Vincent Duncker (9 November 1884 – unknown) was a German athlete who competed mainly in the 110 metre hurdles.

He competed for Germany in the 1906 Intercalated Games held in Athens, Greece in the 110 metre hurdles where he won the Bronze medal.

1884 births
Year of death missing
German male hurdlers
Olympic athletes of Germany
Olympic bronze medalists for Germany
Medalists at the 1906 Intercalated Games
Athletes (track and field) at the 1906 Intercalated Games
Place of birth missing